Mehdi Golshani (Persian: مهدی گلشنی, born  1939 in Isfahan, Iran) is a contemporary Iranian theoretical physicist, academic, scholar, philosopher and distinguished professor at Sharif University of Technology.
He is also member of Iranian Science and Culture Hall of Fame, senior fellow of Academy of Sciences of Iran and a founding fellow of the Institute for Studies in Theoretical Physics and Mathematics. He is a former member of the Supreme Council of the Cultural Revolution.

History 
He received his B.Sc. in Physics from Tehran University in 1959 and his Ph.D. in Physics with a specialization in particle physics in 1969 from the University of California, Berkeley. The title of his doctoral dissertation is "Electron impact excitation of heavily ionized atoms".

Life

Career 
Mehdi Golshani is a distinguished lecturer. His main research areas include foundational physics, particle physics, physical cosmology and philosophical implications of quantum mechanics. He is known as a thinker for his writings on science, religion and their interrelation.

Golshani is the founder and chairman of the Faculty of Philosophy of Science at Sharif University of Technology. He is also the director of the Institute of Humanities and Cultural Studies, Tehran, Iran, and a professor at Physics Department of Sharif University of Technology, as well as a Senior Fellow of School of Physics at Institute for Studies in Theoretical Physics and Mathematics (IPM).

He is a member of American Association of Physics Teachers, and Center for Theology and Natural Science, as well as a Senior Associate of International Centre for Theoretical Physics, Trieste, Italy. He is also Member of Philosophy of Science Association, Michigan, U.S. and European Society for the Study of Science and Theology.

He has been among the winners of the first year of the Templeton Science & Religion course program and also among the Former Judges of The Templeton Prize. Golshani is a fellow of Islamic World Academy of Sciences IAS.

He has written numerous books and articles on physics, philosophy of physics, science and religion, as well as science and theology. In most of Golshani's works, there is a clear attempt to help revive the scientific spirit in the Muslim world.

Views
on the foundation of quantum mechanics
 he is mainly concerned with the orthodox interpretation of quantum mechanics and the possible more realistic alternatives, particularly Bohmian Mechanics.

On the interrelationship of science and religion
 He is a Muslim scientist and thinker who has deep roots in both science and religion.

On Christianity and the development of modern science 
The biblical world view has had a significant impact in the development of science.  Professor Mehdi Golshani connotates a connection between a belief in the Biblical God and scientific breakthroughs by stating that Copernicus, Kepler, Galileo, Boyle, Newton and many other founders of science were all devout Christians. Western Science was largely constructed within the framework of a Christian world view, and was influenced by the following Biblical concepts:

Quotes 
 "The conception of an omniscient and omnipotent personal God, [w]ho made everything in accordance with a rational plan and purpose, contributed to the notion of a rationally structured creation".
"The notion of a transcendent God, [w]ho exists separate from His creation, served to counter the notion that the physical world, or any part of it, is sacred. Since the entire physical world is a mere creation, it was thus a fit object of study and transformation".
 "Since man was made in the image of God (Gen.1:26), which included rationality and creativity, it was deemed possible that man could discern the rational structure of the physical universe that God had made".
 "The cultural mandate, which appointed man to be God's steward over creation (Gen1:28), provided the motivation for studying nature and for applying that study towards practical ends, at the same time glorifying God for His wisdom and goodness".
 "In the popular mind, the two greatest historical conflicts between science and religion have been those involving Galileo and Darwin.
 "The Galileo affair, in the early 17th century, was a complex dispute, inflamed by politics and personalities. It was primarily a family squabble within Christianity. Two different scientific research programs clashed, each program supported by its own group of Christian scientists. The central issue was the epistemological question of how to determine absolute motion. Should the absolute frame of reference be set by Biblical standards, by Aristotelian philosophy, by mathematical simplicity [...] or by other considerations? The difficulty was that the observational data in themselves can yield information only about relative motion. The question of absolute motion must thus be settled by extra-scientific definitions and considerations. As is now widely recognized, the resolution of this issue depends largely on one's worldview assumptions".
 "The conflict precipitated by Darwin concerns primarily origins. How did life, in all its manifold forms, come to be? The dispute is not so much about observations of living things, fossils, geological formations, etc. but how to explain how they came to be. As such, the conflict involves questions concerning the ultimate nature of reality (e.g., can mind be explained entirely in terms of matter?), eschatology (e.g., does man have a non-material soul that survives physical death?)[...] and causation (e.g., does the origin of life require special divine acts?). Again, a central issue is one of epistemology: what role should divine revelation (e.g., the Bible) play in interpreting the results of observational science, in choosing the theories of science [...] and in informing our view of origins, etc? Here, too, it is clear that this conflict is rooted in a clash of opposing extra-scientific presuppositions".

Works

Books 
 تحليلى بر ديدگاههاى فلسفى فيزيكدانان معاصر (a Probe into the Philosophical Viewpoints of Contemporary Physicists). in Persian.
 علم دینی و علم سکولار (Secular and religious science). in Persian.
 Golshani, Mehdi. Holy Quran and the Sciences of Nature. Paperback ed. Studies in Contemporary Philosophical Th., 1997.
 From Physics to Metaphysics, Institute for Humanities and Cultural Studies, Tehran, 1998
 Golshani, Mehdi. Can Science Dispense with Religion? Hardcover ed. I.H.C.S., 1998.
 English Translation of the Holy Qur'an, Vol. 1, Islamic Propagation Organization, Tehran, 1991

As a contributor
 "The Sciences of Nature in an Islamic Perspective" in The Concept of Nature in Science & Theology (SSTh 4/1996), ed. by N. H. Gregersen et al. (Geneva: Labor et Fides, 1998), pp. 56–62.
 _ and Shojai, A. "Direct Particle Quantum Interaction" in Contemporary Fundamental Physics, 1, ed. by V.V. Dvoeglazor (Huntington, New York: Nova Publishers, Inc., 2000), p. 270.
 "Ways of Understanding Nature in the Qur’anic Perspective" in The Interplay between Scientific and Theological Worldviews (SSTh 6/1998), ed. by N. H. Gregersen et al. (Geneva: Labor et Fides, 1999), p. 183.
 "Philosophy of Science from the Qur’anic Perspective" in Towards Islamization of Disciplines (Hendon, Virginia: International Institute of Islamic Thought, 1989), p. 71.
 "Theistic Science" in God for the Twenty First Century (USA: John Templeton Foundation, 2000).
 "Have Physicists Been Able to Dispense with Philosophy?" in Recent Advances in Relativity Theory, ed. by M. C. Duffy & M. Wegener (Palm Harbor, Fl. : Hadronic Press, 2001) p. 90.
 "The Ladder of God" in Faith in Science: Scientists Search for Truth (London: Routledge, Fall 2001).
 "Causality in the Islamic Outlook and in Modern Physics" in Studies in Science and Theology, Vol. 8, ed. by N. H. Gregersen (ESSSAT, Fall 2001).

Articles 
 Golshani, Mehdi. "Does Science Offer Evidence of a Transcendent Reality and Purpose:." Islam and Science (Refereed) 1 (2003): 45-65.
 Golshani, Mehdi. "Some Important Questions Concerning the Relationship Between Science and Religion." Islam and Science 3.1 (2003): 63-83.
 Scientific Papers

References

External links 
 Homepage - Sharif Univ. of Tech.
 Webpage - Islamic World Academy of Sciences
 Webpage - Institute for Studies in Theoretical Physics and Mathematics
 Webpage - Centre for Islam and Science
 Interview (audio) - Meta Library

Quantum physicists
Iranian physicists
Members of the International Society for Science and Religion
Particle physicists
Scientists from Isfahan
Academic staff of Sharif University of Technology
University of California, Berkeley alumni
University of Tehran alumni
1939 births
Living people
Recipients of the Order of Knowledge
Iranian Science and Culture Hall of Fame recipients in Mathematics and Physics
Iran's Book of the Year Awards recipients